The hooded monarch (Symposiachrus manadensis) is a species of bird in the family Monarchidae.
It is found on New Guinea. Its natural habitat is subtropical or tropical moist lowland forests.

Taxonomy and systematics
The hooded monarch was described by the French zoologists 
Jean Quoy and Joseph Gaimard in 1832 from a specimen which they mistakenly claimed had been collected in Manado on the island of Célèbes (now Sulawesi). They coined the binomial name, Muscicapa manadensis. In 1941 the type locality was redesignated as Manokwari in New Guinea.

The hooded monarch was originally described in the genus Muscicapa and then placed in Monarcha until moved to Symposiachrus in 2009. Alternate names include the black-and-white monarch, black-and-white monarch flycatcher and white-bellied monarch.

Notes

References

hooded monarch
Birds of New Guinea
hooded monarch
Taxonomy articles created by Polbot